Chaetostoma stannii is a freshwater species of catfish in the family Loricariidae.  It is a demersal fish with a distribution entirely within tropical South America, where it is native to the basins of the Aroa River, the Tocuyo River, the Urama River, and the Yaracuy River in Venezuela. It has a maximum reported total length of 20.5 cm (8.1 inches).

References 

stannii
Fish described in 1874